James Dee Cole (born November 3, 1937) is an American politician. He served as a Democratic member in the Texas House of Representatives from 1961 to 1975.

References

1937 births
Living people
Members of the Texas House of Representatives